Rev. Martin Coen was an Irish priest and historian (6 October 1933 – 2 December 1997).

Coen was a grandnephew of Fr. Thomas Cawley (1878–1949) and a great-grandnephew of Fr. Edward Holland, O.D.C. (1838–1918). Born at Raheen House, Gort, to Thomas Coen and Mary Holland, he was educated at Kiltartan national school and St. Mary's College, Galway (1947–52). He studied for the priesthood in the Irish College in Rome and was ordained in 1958.

Fr. Martin Coen died on 2 December 1997 and is buried in Ballymore Cemetery, Craughwell, Co. Galway.

Select bibliography

 The Wardenship of Galway, 1791-1831, private circulation, 1967.
 Researcher for The Life of John Phillip Holland by R.N. Morris, Annapolis, 1966
 Dr. Edmund Ffrench, Galway, The Presentation Convent, n.d.
 The Mantle 1958-74, contributed forty articles.
 The Irish College in Rome, in Bethleham, Dublin, 1959.
 History of St. Mary's College in Altra, Galway, 1963.

References

 Galway Authors, Helen Maher, 1976.
 In Memorium, Journal of the Galway Archaeological and Historical Society, Vol 50 (1998) pp. 218–219.

1933 births
1993 deaths
People from County Galway
20th-century Irish Anglican priests
20th-century Irish historians
Irish writers